Joru Ka Ghulam is a 2000 Indian Hindi comedy movie. The film is directed by Shakeel Noorani  and stars Govinda, Twinkle Khanna, Kader Khan and Johnny Lever. The music is by Aadesh Shrivastava. The film was released on 16 June 2000. In an interview with Lehren, Khanna said that the film was completed quickly and it was "one of her best experiences".

Story

Wealthy Dyaneshwarprasad Pitamber has a problem, to be precise four problems - his four uncontrollable daughters, named after four Goddesses: Lakshmi, Saraswati, Parvati, and Durga, who refuse to be disciplined, and be married. Pitamber arranges for Raju Patel to come from the U.S. and marry at least one of his daughters. Unfortunately, Raju is waylaid at the airport by two con men, Raja and Kanhaiya, and his luggage, clothes, and id. is taken over by them, and he is left in barely basic clothing at the airport, mistaken for a beggar. Raja assumes the identity of Raju, and Kanhaiya accompanies him to Pitamber's house. Once there, they are welcomed with open arms by Pitamber, and Raja agrees to all conditions set up by Pitamber and his daughters in order to get married and inherent part of the vast wealth and fortune. Sensing something wrong somewhere, Pitamber asks Raja to locate three other grooms for his three daughters also, otherwise, no marriage will take place, as he wants all four daughters to be married at the same time. With all four refusing to marry anyone, looks like Raja and Kanhaiya have a lot on their hands, apart from hiding from notorious criminal Pappu Anna, who has sworn to kill them for making him suffer a huge financial loss.

Cast
 Govinda as Raja
 Twinkle Khanna as Durga
 Kader Khan   as Dhaneshwar Pitamber
 Johnny Lever as Kanhaiya
 Ashok Saraf as Mama
 Ali Asgar as Raju Patel 
 Ashish Vidyarthi as Pappu Anna
 Razzak Khan as Fida Hussain (Pitambar's Secretary)
 Ghanshyam Rohera as Warden at Mental Hospital
 Rakhi Sawant as Chandni, Pinjara Bar Dancer
 Rajshree Solanki as Lakshmi (Durga's sister #1)
 Sonu Sagar as Saraswati (Durga's sister #2)
 Rushika Reikhi as Parvati (Durga's sister #3)

Soundtrack

The songs for the film were composed by  Aadesh Shrivastava.

Khanna felt that the film's music was its strongest part. In his review for Rediff.com, Syed Firdaus Ashraf opined that Srivastava's music was the "good and different" in the film. All songs were good especially "Neeche Phoolon Ki Dukan" was chart-baster .

Reception
Syed Firdaus Ashraf praised the performances of Govinda and Johnny Lever and called Khanna "passable", while noting that Razzak Khan's role was a "pleasant change from his earlier roles" and his character was hilarious. Taran Adarsh of Bollywood Hungama wrote that the film belonged to Govinda and in one of her "better performances", Khanna looked "ravishing" and portrayed her emotions "very well".

References

External links
 

2000 films
Films scored by Aadesh Shrivastava
2000s Hindi-language films